Jacques Léopold de La Tour d'Auvergne (Jacques Léopold Charles Godefroy; 15 January 1746 – 7 February 1802) was a member of the House of La Tour d'Auvergne, the sovereign dukes of Bouillon. He was the last Duke of Bouillon succeeding his father in 1792.

Early life

The eldest and only surviving of four sons, he was born to the Godefroy de La Tour d'Auvergne, Duke of Bouillon  and Princess Louise Henriette Gabrielle de Lorraine-Marsan in 1746. From 1771, Jacques Léopold was styled as the Prince of Turenne as the heir of the Duchy of Bouillon.

His first cousin was Henri Louis de Rohan-Guéméné, the scandalous Prince of Guéméné

Personal life

He married Princess Hedwig of Hesse-Rheinfels-Rotenburg, daughter of Konstantin, Landgrave of Hesse-Rheinfels-Rotenburg and his wife Countess Marie Sophia Theresia Hedwig Eva of Starhemberg, widowed Princess of Nassau-Siegen and sister of Georg Adam, Prince of Starhemberg. Hewdig was grand daughter of Ernest Leopold, Landgrave of Hesse-Rheinfels-Rotenburg and Princess Eleonore of Löwenstein-Wertheim-Rochefort and Konrad Sigmund, Count of Starhemberg and Princess Maria Leopoldine of Löwenstein-Wertheim-Rochefort. The couple were married at Carlsburg on 17 July 1766 but had no children.

Later life

He lived at the Château de Navarre, his French estate, prior to the revolution and succeeded his father in 1792. During the collapse of the Ancien Régime, the duchy of Bouillon was taken from him in 1794 and absorbed into France in October 1795. He was known as citoyen Léopold La Tour d'Auvergne during the revolution. However, in 1800, he recovered the duchy but was obliged to pay off debts to the tune of 3 million Livres.

Jacques was the last Duke of Bouillon, and following the Napoleonic Wars the duchy was absorbed into the Grand Duchy of Luxembourg (Bouillon later became part of Belgium). He had no known descendants. The Princes of Guéméné today claim the Duchy of Bouillon as their own due to the marriage of Marie Louise (his aunt) and Jules de Rohan, Prince of Guéméné.

Ancestry

References and notes

1746 births
1802 deaths
Jacques Leopold
French Roman Catholics
18th-century French people
19th-century French people
Dukes of Bouillon
Grand Chamberlains of France
People of Byzantine descent
Dukes of Château-Thierry